The Custos Rotulorum of Cavan was the highest civil officer in County Cavan. The position was later combined with that of Lord Lieutenant of Cavan.

Incumbents

?–?1673 Sir Francis Hamilton, 1st Baronet (died 1673)
1673–?1689  Sir Charles Hamilton, Bt (died 1689)
1780–1800 Charles Coote, 1st Earl of Bellomont
1801–>1819 Nathaniel Sneyd (died 1833)
1831->1834 Thomas Taylour, 2nd Marquess of Headfort

For later custodes rotulorum, see Lord Lieutenant of Cavan

References

Cavan